Mosby Court is a Housing Project also a neighborhood. The neighborhood is named Mosby while the Housing Project is named Mosby Court. Mosby Court is located in the East End quadrant of Richmond, Virginia Adjacent to the Richmond City Jail, Mosby Court is primarily served by Coalter Street, which accesses the community North 18th Street (U.S. Route 360). Directly south of the neighborhood is Martin Luther King Jr. Middle School.

See also 

 Neighborhoods of Richmond, Virginia
 Richmond, Virginia

References

External links 
 Map of Mosby Court

Neighborhoods in Richmond, Virginia